It's a Living (renamed for season two as Making a Living) is an American sitcom television series set in a restaurant at the top of the Bonaventure Hotel in Los Angeles. The show aired on ABC from October 30, 1980, until June 11, 1982. After the series was canceled by ABC, new episodes aired in first-run syndication from September 28, 1985, to April 8, 1989. The series was created by Stu Silver, Dick Clair and Jenna McMahon and produced by Witt/Thomas Productions, later in association with Golden West Television (1985–86) and Lorimar-Telepictures (1986–89). Currently, the series is distributed by Paul Brownstein Productions and Warner Bros. Television Distribution.

Synopsis
The show follows the lives of the waitresses at the posh restaurant Above the Top, located at the top of the Bonaventure Hotel in Los Angeles, California. At the helm is supervisor Nancy Beebe (Marian Mercer), the restaurant's maître d’, who sometimes fraternizes with the girls but usually gives orders. More often than not the scheme of the week involves upsetting Nancy in some way. Adding to the chaotic working environment is a wisecracking pianist named Sonny Mann (Paul Kreppel), who makes rude comments to the women, Nancy included, and gets insulted in return. The kitchen is first the domain of Chef Mario (Bert Remsen), then Dennis Hubner (Earl Boen), and finally Howard Miller (Richard Stahl), who eventually marries Nancy.

Cast

Richard Kline also appeared as recurring character Richie, Jan's new husband, in seasons 3 through 6.

Episodes

The show's two broadcast seasons produced 27 episodes. An additional 93 episodes were produced for the syndication run, making a total of 120 episodes.

Title changes
Like many other sitcoms that aired during the 1980–81 television season, It's a Living felt the effects of the Screen Actors Guild and American Federation of Television and Radio Artists strike that occurred in 1980. This caused the show to have an abbreviated first season of only thirteen episodes.

The series was not a ratings success.  For season 2 the cast was retooled extensively and the series was given a new title.  Two of the five waitresses from the first season—Lois Adams and Vicki Allen, played by actresses Susan Sullivan and Wendy Schaal, respectively—were replaced with waitress Maggie McBurney, portrayed by actress Louise Lasser. Airing in 1981 under the new title Making a Living, this iteration did not catch on either, and the show was canceled at the end of the season. In syndication, the second season airs under the original title It's a Living.

Of all the cast, only Gail Edwards (Dot Higgins), Marian Mercer (Nancy Beebe Miller), Barrie Youngfellow (Jan Hoffmeyer Gray), and Paul Kreppel (Sonny Mann) lasted through the show's network and syndicated runs. Ann Jillian (Cassie Cranston) appeared during the network run and the first year of syndication. Crystal Bernard and Richard Stahl were on for the entire syndicated run.

Syndication
While the show was never a hit on network TV, its fortunes would later turn in 1983 when all 27 episodes went to syndication. The series began to attract a following along with surprising ratings for the reruns, which prompted the producers and Golden West Television to bring it back. Another factor in its sudden rediscovery was Ann Jillian's public disclosure that she had been diagnosed with breast cancer in 1984, the same year as the announcement of the show's revival.

In 1985, the show was revived under its old name for the syndicated market. Most of the cast remained intact from the former version. A new waitress, Amy Tompkins (Crystal Bernard), arrived at the restaurant and was immediately accepted by the group. When Jillian decided to leave the show in 1986 (she had agreed to do only one season in syndication, plus she needed to continue her treatments for breast cancer), her character was written out as having married and started a family. She was replaced by Ginger St. James (Sheryl Lee Ralph). With these core cast members in place, the show continued to produce episodes for syndication until it ended in 1989.

From 2000 to 2001, TV Land aired the series occasionally for special programming blocks. In April 2018, Logo TV began to carry the series in marathon form several times a month. Antenna TV ran the series from January 2, 2020 to August 30, 2021. The show as of September 13, 2022 airs on Rewind TV.

References

External links
 
 
 

1980 American television series debuts
1982 American television series endings
1980s American sitcoms
1985 American television series debuts
1989 American television series endings
1980s American workplace comedy television series
American Broadcasting Company original programming
American television series revived after cancellation
English-language television shows
First-run syndicated television programs in the United States
Television series by Warner Bros. Television Studios
Television shows set in Los Angeles
Television series set in restaurants
Television series by Lorimar-Telepictures